The Sino-Pakistan Agreement is a 1963 document between the governments of Pakistan and China establishing the border between those countries in the disputed Kashmir region. 

Pakistan recognized Chinese sovereignty over land in Northern Areas of Kashmir and Ladakh. India claims the agreement is invalid, and claims sovereignty over part of the land. In addition to increasing tensions with India, the agreement shifted the balance of the Cold War by bringing Pakistan and China closer together while loosening ties between Pakistan and the United States.

Issue and result

In 1959, Pakistan became concerned that Chinese maps showed areas of Pakistan in China. In 1961, Ayub Khan sent a formal note to China, there was no reply. 

After Pakistan voted to grant China a seat in the United Nations, the Chinese withdrew the disputed maps in January 1962, agreeing to enter border talks in March. The willingness of the Chinese to enter the agreement was welcomed by the people of Pakistan. Negotiations between the nations officially began on October 13, 1962, and resulted in an agreement being signed on 2 March 1963.  It was signed by foreign ministers Chen Yi for the Chinese and Zulfikar Ali Bhutto for the Pakistani.

China was accommodating to Pakistan's positions during the negotiations. For example, according to Pakistani diplomat Abdul Sattar, after the border alignment was already agreed, the Pakistan side realized that grazing lands falling on the Chinese side had historically been used by inhabitants of Hunza. Zhou Enlai agreed to amend the boundary to add 750 square miles to the Pakistan side to preserve this historic use. China's accommodating approach in the negotiations was motivated not just by the desire to resolve boundary issues; China also wanted to demonstrate its desire for calm borders, its peaceful intentions generally, and China wanted to use a successful conclusion to the boundary issues with Pakistan to portray its border issues with India as a result of India's intransigence.

The claim given up by Pakistan was the area north of the Uprang Jilga River which also included the Raksam Plots where the Mir of Hunza had enjoyed taxing and grazing rights throughout much of the late 19th Century as part of agreements with Chinese authorities in Sinkiang. Despite this, sovereignty over area was never challenged by the Mir of Hunza, the British or the State of Jammu and Kashmir.

Significance
The agreement was moderately economically advantageous to Pakistan, which received grazing lands in the deal, but of far more significance politically, as it both diminished potential for conflict between China and Pakistan and, Syed indicates, "placed China formally and firmly on record as maintaining that Kashmir did not, as yet, belong to India. Time, reporting on the matter in 1963, expressed the opinion that by signing the agreement Pakistan had further "dimmed hopes of settlement" of the Kashmir conflict between Pakistan and India. Under this Sino-Pakistan Agreement, Pakistani control to a part of northern Kashmir was recognized by China.

During this period, China was in dispute with India regarding Kashmir's eastern boundary, with India making claims of the border having been demarcated beforehand and China making claims that such demarcations had never happened. Pakistan and China recognized in their agreement that the border had been neither delimited nor demarcated, providing support to the Chinese position. 

For Pakistan, which had border disputes on its eastern and western borders, the agreement provided relief by securing its northern border from any future contest. The Treaty also provided for clear a demarcation of the boundary for Pakistan, which would continue to serve as the boundary even after Kashmir dispute might be resolved.

According to Jane's International Defence Review, the agreement was also of significance in the Cold War, as Pakistan had ties with the United States and membership in the Central Treaty Organization and the Southeast Asian Treaty Organization. The agreement was part of an overall tightening of association with China for Pakistan, which resulted in Pakistan's distancing from the United States. After defining borders, the two countries also entered into agreements with respect to trade and air-travel, the latter of which was the first such international agreement China had entered with a country that was not Communist.

Relation to the claim by the Republic of China

The Republic of China now based in and commonly known as Taiwan does not recognize any Chinese territorial changes based on any border agreements signed by the People's Republic of China with any other countries, including this one, in accordance to the Constitution of the Republic of China and its Additional Articles.  Pakistan does not recognize the legitimacy of the ROC.

Article 6 
Article six states that pending the final settlement of the Kashmir dispute between India and Pakistan, a fresh treaty will be drawn up.

See also
China–Pakistan Economic Corridor
Trans-Karakoram Tract

Notes and references
Notes

Citations

Bibliography

Further reading 
 

1960s in Jammu and Kashmir
Kashmir conflict
Territorial disputes of India
Territorial disputes of Pakistan
Territorial disputes of China
Sino-Pakistan agreement
Treaties of the People's Republic of China
Treaties of Pakistan
China–Pakistan border
China–Pakistan relations
India–Pakistan relations
Pakistan–United States relations
Cold War treaties
Treaties concluded in 1963
Boundary treaties